Alloiococcus otitis is a species of bacteria first isolated from human middle-ear fluid, the type species of its monotypic genus. The type strain is NCFB 2890.

References

Further reading

External links

LPSN
Type strain of Alloiococcus otitis at BacDive -  the Bacterial Diversity Metadatabase

Lactobacillales
Bacteria described in 1992